Sa Re Ga Ma Pa Championship is an Indian Kannada-language musical/singing reality television show. It is the eighteenth season of Sa Re Ga Ma Pa Kannada. It started airing on Zee Kannada from 18 September 2021 also digitally available on Zee5.

Season overview

Format

The show aired on 18 September 2021 with Anushree as the host. The show is judged by Hamsalekha, Vijay Prakash, Arjun Janya with six mentors, 36 contestants and 40 jury members. Each mentor had six contestants in their team.

Mentors

 Hemanth Kumar
 Nanditha
 Dr Suchethan Rangaswamy
 Indu Nagaraj
 Anuradha Bhat
 Lakshmi Nagaraj

Teams

List of mentors and contestants

  Winners Team
  Runner up Team
  2nd runner up Team

Special Mention Awards
Performer of the Season - Sri Harsha
Entertainer of the Season - Kambada Rangayya

Special Guests

References

External links
 Sa Re Ga Ma Pa Championship at Zee5

2021 Indian television series debuts
Kannada-language television shows
Zee Kannada original programming
Indian reality television series
Sa Re Ga Ma Pa